Rebecca S. Chopp (born 1952) is an academic administrator and professor. She was the 18th chancellor of the University of Denver, and the first female chancellor in the institution's history. Prior to that, Chopp was a president of Swarthmore College and Colgate University.

Biography
Chopp received her B.A. from Kansas Wesleyan University, a Master of Divinity (M.Div.) from St. Paul School of Theology and a Ph.D. from the University of Chicago. Before Swarthmore, Chopp was the president of Colgate University. Before arriving at Colgate in 2002, Chopp was Dean and Titus Street Professor of Theology at Yale Divinity School. She spent fifteen years at Emory University before her tenure at Yale.

Chopp's research focuses on religion and American culture, but she has also written about the culture of higher education and the liberal arts in a democratic society.

Chopp was also one of more than 100 college presidents in the United States to call for the drinking age to be lowered.

In June 2014, she announced her decision to accept the position of chancellor of the University of Denver, citing her desire to live in Denver as one of the reasons for leaving Swarthmore. In the summer of 2019, Chancellor Chopp resigned because of health problems.

References

External links
 Swarthmore College's 14th President – Biography
 Rebecca Chopp, President-Designate: First Words

Living people
Kansas Wesleyan University alumni
Saint Paul School of Theology alumni
University of Chicago alumni
Presidents of the American Academy of Religion
Chancellors of the University of Denver
Presidents of Colgate University
Presidents of Swarthmore College
Yale Divinity School faculty
Emory University faculty
Women heads of universities and colleges
1952 births